The Old American Company was an American theatre company. It was the first fully professional theatre company to perform in North America. It also played a vital role in the theatre history of Jamaica. It was founded in 1752 and disbanded in 1805. It was known as the Hallam Company (1752–1758), the American Company (1758–1785) and the Old American Company (1785–1805).  With a few temporary exceptions, the Company enjoyed a de facto monopoly of professional theatre in the United States until 1790.

History

Hallam Company

The company was organised by William Hallam, former proprietor of the New Wells Theatre in London, and was led by his brother Lewis Hallam.  Their company consisted of 12 adults and 3 children, drawn from English actors of "modest accomplishment".

They arrived by the vessel Charming Sally at Yorktown, Virginia, on 2 June 1752, and made their early performances in nearby Williamsburg.  Their first performance, The Merchant of Venice, is generally considered to be the first professional staging of Shakespeare in America.   In 1753 the Hallam company moved to New York, and in 1754 they played in Philadelphia and in Charleston, South Carolina.

First Jamaica Tour

In 1755 the company moved to Jamaica in the West Indies.  In Jamaica, the performed in the 'New Theatre' in the King's Store on Harbour Street in Kingston with the company of David Douglass.   On Lewis' death, David Douglass married his widow Sarah Hallam Douglass.  The company merged with the company of David Douglass. In 1758, the company returned to tour the mainland, as the "American Company".

American Company

Lewis' son, Lewis Hallam Jr., eighteen at the time of the American Company's first tour, took leading roles alongside Douglass. Lewis Jr.'s style was described as declaratory rather than realistic, but he was much admired and became known as America's leading Shakespearean interpreter.    Douglass had his limitations: one Alexander Graydon described him as "rather a decent than shining actor". However, he was a capable manager and he gave North America its first Falstaff and King John. Within the repertoire was Cymbeline, which proved a popular vehicle for two of the company's actresses, Margaret Cheer and Nancy Hallam.

In Quaker and Puritan areas, the company encountered religious opposition to theatre in general. At Rhode Island in 1761 they were obliged to perform Othello disguised as "a series of moral dialogues".

Second Jamaica Tour

In 1774, the Continental Congress banned theatre entirely, and the company resettled in Jamaica.  By that time, Hugh F. Ranking calculates that the company had performed at least 180 times, their repertoire having included fourteen of Shakespeare's plays.

The Company achieved great success in Jamaica, as the island had a great interest for theatre but no professional theater had existed since they left sixteen years prior.  Finding the old playhouse in Kingston not sufficient to their needs, the company successfully asked the authorities to construct the Kingston Theatre in Kingston, where they performed three or four times a week from 1775 onward: they also constructed theatres in Spanish Town and Montego Bay.  David Douglass even served in the office of Master of the Revels, responsible of the representational festivities of the Governor, in 1779–80, and Lewis Hallam Jr. in 1781–1783.

Old American Company

After the peace of 1783, the company left Jamaica in July 1785 and returned to New York, with Lewis Hallam Jr. as the leading actor, and John Henry as his co-manager.  The theatre ban was still in place, and until it was lifted, the company officially named its plays "recitals", operatic performances and similar euphemisms for theater plays.

The Old American Company virtually had monopoly of theatre performances in the United States until 1790, when Thomas Wade West and John Bignall split from the Company and formed the Virginia Comedians, performing in Virginia and South Carolina, followed the next year by the foundation of the Philadelphia Company of Thomas Wignell and Owen Morris.  After this, the Old American Company was essentially active in New York: first at the John Street Theatre, and from 1798 at the Park Theatre.  In 1805, the Company went bankrupt.

Legacy

The Company enjoyed a de facto monopoly on professional theatrical performances in North America until the 1790s.  In many places, they were the first professional company to perform theatre, and they founded playhouses for their use in many of the cities and towns they visited, often the very first playhouses in those places.  They toured from Newport in Rhode Island to Williamsburg in Virginia, and between Annapolis, Philadelphia and New York.  They founded a playhouse in New York in 1754, the 'New Theatre' playhouse in Charleston, South Carolina in 1754, the Southwark Theatre in Philadelphia in 1766, the John Street Theatre in New York in 1767, and the New Theatre in Annapolis in 1770.

Managers
 1752-1756: Lewis Hallam
 1756-1758: Sarah Hallam Douglass 
 1758-1779: David Douglass 
 1779-1796: Lewis Hallam Jr.
 1780-1794: John Henry, Co-manager
 1794-1799: John Hodgkinson, Co-manager
 1796-1805: William Dunlap

Members

Hallam Company in 1752
In 1752, when the Hallam Company departed from London and arrived in Williamsburg in Virginia, the Company had twelve adult members:

 Lewis Hallam
 Sarah Hallam
 William Rigby
 'Mrs. Rigby'
 Thomas Clarkson
 'Mrs. Clarkson'
 Mary Palmer
 John Singleton
 'Mr. Herbert'
 'Mr. Winnell' or Wynel
 William Adcock
 Patrick Malone

American Company in 1766
In November 1766, when the Southwark Theatre in Philadelphia opened, the American Company had the following members:
 Adam Allyn
 Margaret Cheer
 David Douglass
 Sarah Hallam Douglass
 'Miss Dowthwaite'
 James Godwin
 Lewis Hallam Jr.
 Catharine Maria Harman
 'Mr. Mathews'
 Owen Morris
 Mary Morris
 'Mr. Tomlinson'
 Anna Tomlinson
 Sarah Wainwright
 Thomas Wall
 Stephen Woolls

By October 1767, new members were:
 Patrick Malone
 'Mr. Roberts'
 John Henry
 Ms. Storers (Ann, Maria and Fanny)

American Company in 1773
In 1773–74, when the American Company departed to Jamaica, the Company had the following members:

 'Mr. Byerley'
 'Mr. Dermot'
 David Douglass
 Richard Goodman
 Lewis Hallam Jr.
 Nancy Hallam
 Catharine Maria Harman
 John Henry
 'Mr. Johnson'
 Owen Morris
 Elizabeth Walker Morris
 Charles Parker
 Mary Richardson 
 'Mr. Roberts'
 Miss Storer (Ann, Maria or Fanny)
 Thomas Wall
 'Mrs. Wall' 
 Stephen Woolls
 George Hughues
 Sarah Wainwright

The cast lists mention Thomas Wignell, Mrs. Hamilton, Mrs. Raynard, Mr. Sales, Mr. Mores, Mr. and Mrs. Godwin in the period of 1779-82.

Old American Company in 1788

In 1788, around the time when the theatre ban was lifted in the United States, the American Company had the following members:

 Lewis Hallam Jr.
 John Henry
 Maria Henry
 Stephen Woolls
 Owen Morris
 Elizabeth Walker Morris
 Thomas Wignell
 Charles Biddle
 'Mr. J. Kenna'
 'Mrs. Kenna'
 'Miss Kenna'
 Eliza Tuke 
 'Mrs. Hamilton'
 'Mrs. Williamsson'
 Joseph Harper
 'Mrs. Harper'
 Fanny Storer

Other members included John Martin (from 1790), referred to as the first American-born actor.  In 1792, John Hodgkinson joined.

Old American Company in 1798
In 1798, when the American Company moved into Park Theatre in New York, the Company had the following members (listed in order of salary):

 Lewis Hallam Jr.
 Eliza Hallam 
 John Johnson
 Mrs. Johnson
 Georgina George Oldmixon
 Thomas Apthorpe Cooper
 Charlotte Melmoth
 Joseph Tyler
 Joseph Jefferson I
 John Martin 
 Mirvan Hallam
 Ann Storer Hogg
 John Hogg
 Juliana Westray
 Ellen Westray
 'Mr. Lee'
 'Mrs. Seymour'
 'Mr. Seymour'
 John D. Miller
 'Miss. Hogg'
 'Mrs. Collins'

Old American Company in 1804
In 1804, the last season of the American Company, the Company had the following members:

 Lewis Hallam Jr.
 Eliza Hallam 
 John E. Harwood
 John Johnson
 Elizabeth Ford Johnson
 Joseph Tyler
 Ann Storer Hogg'
 John Hogg
 John Martin
 John Claude
 'Mrs. Claude'
 Joseph Harper
 'Mrs. Harper'
 John Darley
 Ellen Darley
 'Mr. Darby'
 Charlotte Melmoth
 Mirvan Hallam
 'Mr. Shapter'
 'Mr. Robinson'
 'Mr. M'Donald'

References

Theatre in the United States
18th century in the United States
18th-century theatre
18th century in Jamaica